

Offseason 
 December 5, 1977: Bruce Compton (minors) and Norm Churchill (minors) were traded by the Indians to the Chicago Cubs for Dave Rosello.
 February 28, 1978: Tom Buskey and John Lowenstein were traded by the Indians to the Texas Rangers for Willie Horton and David Clyde.
 March 15, 1978: Rico Carty was traded by the Indians to the Toronto Blue Jays for Dennis DeBarr.
 March 30, 1978: Dennis Eckersley and Fred Kendall were traded by the Indians to the Boston Red Sox for Rick Wise, Mike Paxton, Ted Cox, and Bo Díaz.

Regular season 
On May 12, pitcher Nolan Ryan of the California Angels struck out Buddy Bell for the 2500th strikeout of his career.

Season standings

Record vs. opponents

Notable transactions 
 June 14, 1978: Dennis Kinney was traded by the Indians to the San Diego Padres for Dan Spillner.
 June 15, 1978: Mike Vail was traded by the Indians to the Chicago Cubs for Joe Wallis.
 June 15, 1978: Joe Wallis was traded by the Indians to the Oakland Athletics for Gary Alexander.
 June 22, 1978: Bill Laxton was traded by the Indians to the San Diego Padres for Dave Freisleben.
 June 26, 1978: Dennis DeBarr was traded by the Indians to the Chicago Cubs for Paul Reuschel.
 July 3, 1978: Willie Horton was released by the Indians.

Opening Day Lineup

Roster

Player stats

Batting
Note: G = Games played; AB = At bats; R = Runs scored; H = Hits; 2B = Doubles; 3B = Triples; HR = Home runs; RBI = Runs batted in; AVG = Batting average; SB = Stolen bases

Pitching
Note: W = Wins; L = Losses; ERA = Earned run average; G = Games pitched; GS = Games started; SV = Saves; IP = Innings pitched; R = Runs allowed; ER = Earned runs allowed; BB = Walks allowed; K = Strikeouts

Awards and honors

All-Star Game

Farm system

Notes

References 
1978 Cleveland Indians team page at Baseball Reference
1978 Cleveland Indians team page at www.baseball-almanac.com

Cleveland Guardians seasons
Cleveland Indians season
Cincinnati Indians